Indian River may refer to:

Rivers

In Barbados
 Indian River (Barbados)

In Canada
Indian River (British Columbia), which enters Indian Arm to the north of North Vancouver
Indian River, a tidal flow east of Deer Island, New Brunswick
In Ontario:
Indian River (Algoma District), a right tributary of the Montreal River
Indian River (Rice Lake), in Peterborough County, which flows from Stoney Lake to Rice Lake
Indian River (Lanark County), a tributary of the Mississippi River
Indian River (Muskoka District), which flows from Lake Rosseau to Lake Muskoka
Indian River (Muskrat River watershed), in Renfrew County and Nipissing District, a left tributary of the Muskrat River
In the Yukon:
Indian River (Yukon), a tributary of the Yukon River
Dän Tàgé, formerly known as the Indian River

In Dominica
Indian River (Dominica), a river in Portsmouth

In the United States
Indian River (Alaska)
Indian River (Delaware)
Indian River (Florida)
Indian River (Maine)
Southwest Branch Indian River
In Michigan:
Indian River (Manistique River tributary), in the Upper Peninsula
Indian River (Mullett Lake), in the Lower Peninsula
Indian River (New Hampshire)
In New York:
Indian River (Black Lake), a tributary of the Oswegatchie River in far northern New York
Indian River (Hudson River tributary), in the Adirondack Mountains
Indian River (Moose River tributary), in the Adirondack Mountains, part of the Black River watershed
Indian River (West Canada Creek tributary), in the Adirondack Mountains, part of the Mohawk River watershed
Indian River (South Dakota), a tributary of the Big Sioux River
Indian River (Virginia)

Communities

In Canada
 Indian River, Ontario, a community in Otonabee-South Monaghan
 Indian River (reserve), a First Nations reserve in Ontario
 Indian River, Prince Edward Island

In the United States
 Indian River Hundred, an unincorporated subdivision of Sussex County, Delaware
 Indian River County, Florida
 Indian River Estates, Florida
 Indian River Shores, Florida
 Indian River, Michigan

Other uses
 "Indian River" (poem), a 1917 poem by Wallace Stevens
 , a sidewheel steamer built in 1861, formerly USS Clyde

See also

 
 
 
 List of rivers of India
 Indian River High School (disambiguation)
 Indian River School District (disambiguation)
 Indian (disambiguation)
 River (disambiguation)
 Indian Brook (disambiguation)
 Indian Creek (disambiguation)
 Indian Run (disambiguation)
 Indian Stream (disambiguation)